Lee Jae-ryong (born September 24, 1964) is a South Korean actor. He is best known for starring in television series, notably the merchant-centered period epic Sangdo (2001), the medical drama General Hospital (1994 and 2008), and Noh Hee-kyung-penned dramas such as Foolish Love (2000) and Goodbye Solo (2006).

Filmography

Television series

Film

Variety show

Awards and nominations

References

External links
 
 
 

1964 births
Living people
South Korean male television actors
South Korean male film actors
Chung-Ang University alumni
Korea University alumni
SM Entertainment artists